Dolosicoccus paucivorans is a Gram-positive bacteria from the family of Dolosicoccus which has been isolated from human blood in the United States.

References

Bacteria described in 1999
Lactobacillales